Thiotricha synodonta is a moth of the family Gelechiidae. It was described by Edward Meyrick in 1936. It is found in Korea and Japan.

References

Moths described in 1936
Thiotricha
Taxa named by Edward Meyrick